Pseudoscilla saotomensis is a species of sea snail, a marine gastropod mollusk in the family Pyramidellidae, the pyrams and their allies.

Distribution
This marine species only occurs in the Atlantic Ocean off São Tomé and Príncipe.

References

External links
 To Biodiversity Heritage Library (1 publication)
 To Encyclopedia of Life
 To USNM Invertebrate Zoology Mollusca Collection

Pyramidellidae
Invertebrates of São Tomé and Príncipe
Fauna of São Tomé Island
Gastropods described in 1999